The 1974–75 Washington Capitals season was the first in Capitals history. Along with the Kansas City Scouts, the Capitals joined the National Hockey League as an expansion team for the 1974–75 season.  The team was owned by Abe Pollin, owner of the NBA's Washington Bullets.  Pollin had built the Capital Centre in suburban Landover, Maryland, to house both the Bullets (who formerly played in Baltimore) and the Capitals.  His first act as owner was to hire Hall of Famer Milt Schmidt as general manager.

The team's record of 8–67–5 is the worst individual season in the history of the NHL.

Offseason

NHL Draft

Expansion Draft

Regular season
Along with the Kansas City Scouts, the Capitals joined the NHL as an expansion team for the 1974–75 season. With a combined 30 teams between the NHL and the rival World Hockey Association, the talent pool available to stock the new teams was extremely thin. In their first season, the Capitals would set an NHL record for futility, losing 67 of 80 games, and only winning one on the road. The Scouts fared only marginally better (getting their first win against the Capitals, albeit in their tenth game of existence), and the expansion was widely seen as having been a mistake.

The Capitals' inaugural season was dreadful, even by expansion standards.  They finished 8–67–5, which is the worst record in NHL history. Their 21 points were half that of their expansion brethren, the Scouts.  They won only eight games, the fewest ever by a team playing at least 70 games.  Their .131 winning percentage is still the worst in NHL history.  They also set records for most road losses (39 out of 40), most consecutive road losses (37) and most consecutive losses (17), most of which have now been broken.  Schmidt himself had to take over the coaching reins late in the season.  The Capitals failed to qualify for the playoffs.

Of Washington's eight wins, seven of them were decided by two goals or more, with their season superlative 8-4 win in their final game.

The last remaining active member of the 1974–75 Washington Capitals was Ron Low, who played his final NHL game in the 1984–85 season, although he missed the 1978–79 season, as well as the season before this one.

Final standings

Schedule and results

Playoffs
The Capitals had an appalling first season and did not qualify for the playoffs. They had the worst points percentage all-time in NHL post expansion history with a 0.131 win percentage average. In addition, they had the worst road record in NHL history, winning their only road game against the California Golden Seals in the 76th game of the season and third-to-last road game of the season.

Player statistics

Regular season
Scoring

Goaltending

Note: GP = Games played; G = Goals; A = Assists; Pts = Points; +/- = Plus/minus; PIM = Penalty minutes; PPG=Power-play goals; SHG=Short-handed goals; GWG=Game-winning goals
      MIN=Minutes played; W = Wins; L = Losses; T = Ties; GA = Goals against; GAA = Goals against average; SO = Shutouts;

References
 Capitals on Database Hockey
 Capitals Game Log on Database Hockey

Washington Capitals seasons
Wash
Wash
Washing
Washing